ESTDCU (ESTonian Digital Camo Uniform) is the Estonian version of the digital camouflage uniform. The camouflage pattern was developed by Andres Lüll on contract with the Logistics Center of the Estonian Defence Forces. The first set of test uniforms was introduced in 2005.

References

External links
 "From IT specialist to guerilla fighter: Estonia's citizen army gears up to deter Vladimir Putin's war machine" (17 December 2016), Australia: ABC News

 
Military camouflage
Camouflage patterns